Nymphon signatum, the scarlet sea spider, is a species of sea spider.

Distribution
This species is endemic to the South African coast and is found only from Cape Point to Port Alfred.

Description
The scarlet sea spider is 40-50mm across and has a bright red body with long legs. Both sexes have a pair of legs for holding the egg mass.

Ecology
This species is usually found associated with hydroids.

References

Pycnogonids
Animals described in 1902